Riley County USD 378 is a public unified school district headquartered in Riley, Kansas, United States.  The district includes the communities of Riley, Leonardville, Keats, Bala, Lasita, Walsburg, and nearby rural areas.

Schools
The school district operates the following schools:
 Riley County High School
 Riley County Grade School

History
Brad Starnes, who was employed by the district in 2000, served as superintendent until 2015. In June 2013 a bond was proposed but voters defeated it with over 66% voting against it In 2015 Cathy Dawes of KMAN wrote that "Some difficult times have been reported in the last couple years". Nancy Meyer served as interim superintendent until 2016, when Cliff Williams became superintendent.

See also
 Kansas State Department of Education
 Kansas State High School Activities Association
 List of high schools in Kansas
 List of unified school districts in Kansas

References

External links
 

School districts in Kansas
Education in Riley County, Kansas